The Central Avenue School (also known as the Central Avenue Elementary School) is a historic school in Lakeland, Florida, United States. It is located at 604 South Central Avenue. The school was designed by Albert Poteet and built in 1926. On July 22, 1999, it was added to the U.S. National Register of Historic Places.  This building currently houses the West Area Adult School.

References

External links
 Polk County listings at National Register of Historic Places
 West Area Adult School at Florida's Office of Cultural and Historical Programs

Public elementary schools in Florida
Schools in Lakeland, Florida
National Register of Historic Places in Polk County, Florida
School buildings completed in 1926
1926 establishments in Florida